Dê Mullā Samanḏar Şāḩib Kêlay or Mollā Samand is a village in Paktika Province, in eastern Afghanistan.

See also
 Paktika Province

References

Populated places in Paktika Province